Min Bahadur Sherchan (20 June 1931 – 6 May 2017) was a Nepalese mountaineer and former British Gurkha soldier. In 2008, the 76 year old became the oldest climber to summit Mount Everest. He lost the record five years later to 80 year old Japanese mountaineer Yuichiro Miura. Sherchan died at Everest Base Camp on 6 May 2017 while trying to reclaim his title. 

In 2008 Min Bahadur Sherchan beat Yuichiro Miura to the top by one day, and Sherchan tried to top summit again 2013 but had to call off his attempt due to health issues. Prior to this the oldest was Katsusuke Yanagisawa, who at 71 summited on May 22, 2007. In this period, Nepal enacted  a minimum age limit of 16 years old (there was no maximum), and a 2005 study found Everest climbers over age 60 had about a 1 in 10 chance of summiting compared to 1 in 3 chance compared to those under 60. However, those over 60 had an increased chance of dying including a 1 in 4 chance of dying on the way down among those that summited.

Sherchan was born in Myagdi district of Nepal. His funeral was held in Kathmandu, Nepal.

See also
List of Mount Everest records
List of people who died climbing Mount Everest
Mount Everest in 2017
List of world records from Nepal

References

1931 births
2017 deaths
Gurkhas
Nepalese mountain climbers
Nepalese summiters of Mount Everest
Deceased Everest summiters
Mountaineering deaths on Mount Everest
People from Myagdi District
Thakali people